The City of Bradford Metropolitan District Council elections were held on Thursday, 7 May 1987, with one third of the council and a vacancy in Bingley to be elected. Labour retained control of the council.

Election result

This result had the following consequences for the total number of seats on the council after the elections:

Ward results

References

1987 English local elections
1987
1980s in West Yorkshire